Me Kommeni Tin Anasa (Greek: Με Κομμένη Την Ανάσα; English: Breathless) is the first compilation album by popular Greek singer-songwriter Sakis Rouvas, released on 5 October 1999 by Universal Music Greece. It features 16 of his biggest hit singles as well as a bonus CD single with four remixes and an English track called "Oh Girl". The album received a platinum certification.

Track listing
CD 1
"Yia Sena"
"Ase Me Na Fygo"
"Tora Arhizoun Ta Dyskola"
"Afiste Tin"
"Mi M'agapiseis"
"Aima, Dakrya & Idrotas"
"Xana"
"Ela Mou"
"Kane Me"
"Tha S'ekdikitho"
"Min Andistekese"
"Me Kommeni Tin Anasa"
"Gyrna"
"Yia Fantasou"
"Par'ta"
"Yia Sena"
CD 2
"Afiste Tin" (Extended Mix 12")
"Tora Arhizoun Ta Dyskola" (Latin Dance Mix 7")
"Pou ke Pote (7" Remix)
"Xana" (Reggae Mix)
"Oh Girl"

External links
Sakis Rouvas' official website
IFPI Greece official website with Greek charts

Albums produced by Nikos Karvelas
Albums produced by Nikos Terzis
Greek-language albums
Sakis Rouvas compilation albums
1999 remix albums
1999 greatest hits albums
Universal Music Greece remix albums
Universal Music Greece compilation albums
Mercury Records compilation albums
Mercury Records remix albums